Doug Armstrong is a Canadian curler. Between 1998 and 2002, he was the lead in skip Jeff Stoughton's team during the 1999 Labatt Brier competition for 4 consecutive times. He won the Brier in 1999. His team went 10–3 winning in the final against Guy Hemmings of Quebec. He won a silver medal at the 1999 Ford World Men's Curling Championship.

As a result of his successes, on May 2, 2010, Armstrong was inducted as lead, skipped by Jeff Stoughton with Garry VanDenBerghe at second to the Manitoba Curling Hall of Fame.

Teams

References

External links

 Doug Armstrong – Curling Canada Stats Archive

Canadian male curlers
Living people
Curlers from Manitoba
Brier champions
Year of birth missing (living people)